Anomalies is Cephalic Carnage's fourth full-length album. It was released on Relapse Records. A video was released for the album's single, "Dying Will Be the Death of Me". The song is a parody of American metalcore.

Anomalies was released on CD and 12" vinyl format. It was recorded from November to December 2004.

Track listing

Personnel

Cephalic Carnage
 Lenzig Leal – vocals
 Zac Joe – guitar
 John Merryman – drums
 Steve Goldberg – guitar
 Jawsh Mullen – bass

Additional personnel
 Dave Otero – Vocals on "Dying Will Be the Death of Me", production
 Travis Ryan (Cattle Decapitation) – Vocals on "Scientific Remote Viewing"
 Barney Greenway (Napalm Death) – Vocals on "The Will or the Way"
 John Gallagher (Dying Fetus) – Additional vocals
 Corporate Death (Macabre) – Vocals on "Sleeprace"
 Brian Hegman (Black Lamb) – Vocals on "Ontogeny of Behavior"
 Matt Blanks - Violin, Noises
 Evan Sydney Leal - Violin

References

External links

Cephalic Carnage albums
2005 albums
Relapse Records albums